The Cinderella fat-tailed mouse opossum (Thylamys cinderella) is a species of opossum in the family Didelphidae. It is found in northern Argentina and southern Bolivia, in the eastern foothills of the Andes. Its dorsal fur is gray brown to dark brown. Its ventral fur is gray-based, except for the white to yellowish chest hairs. It has been distinguished from T. sponsorius by the well-developed postorbital ridges of the latter, but mitochondrial DNA sequence analysis does not support separate species status for sponsorius.

References

Opossums
Mammals of Argentina
Mammals of Bolivia
Mammals described in 1902
Taxa named by Oldfield Thomas